Walter Stringfellow Taberer (11 April 1872 – 10 February 1938) was a South African international rugby union player. Born in King William's Town, he attended St. Andrew's College, Grahamstown, where he was a Douglass Scholar before playing provincial rugby for Griqualand West. He made his only Test appearance for South Africa during Great Britain's 1896 tour. He played as a centre in the 2nd Test of the series, a 17–8 South Africa loss. Taberer died in 1938, in Bulawayo, at the age of 65.

He also played first-class cricket for Rhodesia.

Notes

References

South African rugby union players
South Africa international rugby union players
Rugby union centres
Rhodesia cricketers
Sportspeople from Qonce
White South African people
South African people of British descent
South African emigrants to Rhodesia
Alumni of St. Andrew's College, Grahamstown
1872 births
1938 deaths
Rugby union players from the Eastern Cape
Griquas (rugby union) players